Holy Cross Abbey may refer to:

in China
Yenki Abbey, Yenki, Jilin Province

in France
Holy Cross Abbey (Poitiers)

in Ireland
Holy Cross Abbey, in Tipperary
Holy Cross Abbey (Arklow), in Wicklow

in the United States
Holy Cross Abbey (Cañon City), listed on the NRHP in Colorado
Holy Cross Abbey, Virginia

See also
 Holy Cross Monastery (disambiguation)